Primacord is a brand of detonating cord used in blasting. The registered trademark Primacord was originally owned by the Ensign-Bickford Company; Ensign-Bickford sold the trademark to Dyno Nobel in 2003, who manufacture it in their Graham, Kentucky factory.  The name is also used as a genericized trademark for any detonating cord.

Description
Primacord consists of a continuous core of PETN, RDX or other high explosive, bound by textile yarns and finished with plastic and wax as waterproofing agents. It is produced in eight strengths:

Primaline is a related product differing principally in having a plastic jacket instead of textile. Primaline is also available in higher loadings, up to 85 g/m (400 gr/ft):

Operation
Primacord is initiated with a blasting cap or by a donor line of detonating cord or other high explosive. It is used to create explosive effects and to build reliable explosive charges. It is used in conjunction with other high explosive materials to form charges, including linear charges, capable of near instantaneous results.

See also
 Cordtex

References

Detonators
Explosives